The Parliamentary Private Secretary to the Prime Minister is a Parliamentary Private Secretary serving the Prime Minister of the United Kingdom. The holder of the office is widely viewed as the Prime Minister's "eyes and ears" on the backbenches, serving as a liaison to the Prime Minister's parliamentary party. The Parliamentary Private Secretary is also responsible for meeting with members of Parliament when the Prime Minister is unavailable, and accompanying the Prime Minister to, and assisting them with preparations for Prime Minister's Questions. They usually sit directly behind the Prime Minister during question time.

Role 
The Parliamentary Private Secretary can become a highly powerful and significant role; Bonar Law's Parliamentary Private Secretary, J.C.C. Davidson acted in effect as his chief of staff. Margaret Thatcher's downfall from the Conservative Party leadership in 1990 is attributed by many to the actions of her Parliamentary Private Secretary, Peter Morrison, in failing to accurately count votes amongst Conservative backbenchers. Some Parliamentary Private Secretaries to the Prime Minister go on to hold higher office; Alec Douglas-Home served as Parliamentary Private Secretary under Neville Chamberlain and later went on to serve as Prime Minister in his own right.

There can be multiple Parliamentary Private Secretaries to the Prime Minister at a given time. Many Prime Ministers have used this tactic during their premierships; former Prime Minister David Cameron only employed one Parliamentary Private Secretary at a time during his tenure in office, but he appointed Sir John Hayes as a minister without portfolio with responsibility for the Parliamentary Conservative Party, a job typically reserved for the Parliamentary Private Secretary.

Parliamentary Private Secretaries to the Prime Minister (1906–present)
The following table lists Parliamentary Private Secretaries to successive Prime Ministers from 1906.

In popular culture
The final instalment of Michael Dobbs's and the BBC's House of Cards trilogy, The Final Cut, includes a character, Claire Carlsen, who serves as Prime Minister Francis Urquhart's Parliamentary Private Secretary, ultimately betraying him by attempting to leak documents about his service in the British Army.

See also
 Downing Street Chief of Staff
Parliamentary Private Secretary
 Parliamentary Private Secretary to the Cabinet Office
Prime Minister's Office
Principal Private Secretary to the Prime Minister of the United Kingdom

References

British Prime Minister's Office
Ministerial offices in the United Kingdom